The 408th Contracting Support Brigade is a contracting support unit in the United States Army with headquarters at Camp Arifjan, Kuwait and Shaw Air Force Base, South Carolina. It is a unit in the United States Army Contracting Command.

The brigade provides operational contracting support to United States Army Central (USARCENT) as the Lead Contract Service throughout Southwest Asia. The brigade prepares and coordinates support plans, provides oversight, assessment, policy and acquisition authority to assigned contingency contracting organizations and contracting assets deployed in support of the USARCENT mission.

Commanders

References

Support 408
United States contract law